Sutton in Ashfield was an Urban District in Nottinghamshire, England from 1894 to 1974. It was created under the Local Government Act 1894.

It was enlarged in 1935 when the Huthwaite urban district and the civil parishes of Fulwood, Skegby and Teversal were transferred to the district.

The district was abolished in 1974 under the Local Government Act 1972 and combined with the Kirkby in Ashfield Urban District, most of Hucknall Urban District and part of Basford Rural District to form the new Ashfield district.

References

Districts of England created by the Local Government Act 1894
Districts of England abolished by the Local Government Act 1972
History of Nottinghamshire
Urban districts of Nottinghamshire
Sutton-in-Ashfield